Felin Fach or Ystrad was a small railway station in the rural location between Ystrad Aeron and Felinfach, the intermediate station on the Aberayron branch of the Carmarthen to Aberystwyth Line in the Welsh county of Ceredigion. Opened by the Lampeter, Aberayron and New Quay Light Railway, the branch to Aberayron diverged from the through line at Lampeter.

History
The branch was incorporated into the Great Western Railway during the Grouping of 1923, passing on to the Western Region of British Railways on nationalisation in 1948. Passenger services were discontinued in 1951, general freight in 1963 and milk traffic in 1973. The station had a passing loop as shown by OS maps.

The Felin Fach station building survives on the Gwili Railway, having been dismantled and re-erected at Llwyfan Cerrig by volunteer rail enthusiasts.

References
Notes

Sources

Great Western Railway Journal Vol 2 No 16 (Autumn 1995)

External links
 DMU near Felin Fach
 Felin Fach station
Railscot on the Lampeter, Aberaeron and New Quay Light Railway 

Former Great Western Railway stations
Disused railway stations in Ceredigion
Railway stations in Great Britain opened in 1911
Railway stations in Great Britain closed in 1951
1911 establishments in Wales